The 2016–17 season is the Al-Qadisiyah Football Club's second consecutive season in Pro League, the top flight of Saudi Arabian football. Along with the Pro League, Al-Qadisiyah also competed in the Crown Prince Cup and King Cup.

Players

Squad information

Transfers

In

Out

On loan

Pre-season and friendlies

Competitions

Overall

Last Updated: 28 October 2016

Pro League

League table

Results summary

Results by round

Matches
All times are local, AST (UTC+3).

Crown Prince Cup

All times are local, AST (UTC+3).

King Cup

Statistics

Goalscorers

Last Updated: 28 October 2016

Clean sheets

Last Updated: 28 October 2016

References

Al-Qadisiyah FC seasons
Qadisiyah